"You Can't Get Away" is the second single from the album I Want You, released by freestyle singer Shana in 1990. The single reached number 82 on the Billboard Hot 100 chart in the US.

Track listing

Charts

References

1990 singles
Shana (singer) songs
1990 songs
Song articles with missing songwriters